The Levi Anthony Building is a historic commercial building located on Broadway in Cape Vincent in Jefferson County, New York.

Description and history 
It is a three-story, five bay wide masonry structure, built in 1884 in the Italianate style of architecture.

It was listed on the National Register of Historic Places on September 27, 1985.

References

Commercial buildings on the National Register of Historic Places in New York (state)
Commercial buildings completed in 1884
Italianate architecture in New York (state)
Buildings and structures in Jefferson County, New York
National Register of Historic Places in Jefferson County, New York